Song for Everyone is an album by Indian violinist L. Shankar, featuring Jan Garbarek, Zakir Hussain and Trilok Gurtu. It was released on the ECM label in 1985.

Reception
Allmusic awarded the album with 4 stars and its review by Richard S. Ginell states: "..a brighter, more outgoing record than its predecessor Vision, veering between Western acoustic and electric grooves and the complex beats churned out by the tabla. Jan Garbarek again shines beams of light on soprano and tenor, engaging Shankar's ten-string double-necked electric violin in some complex interplay on the title track".

Track listing
All compositions by Shankar.

"Paper Nut" – 6:08
"I Know" – 7:38
"Watching You" – 13:17
"Conversation" – 7:55
"Song for Everyone" – 6:28
"Let's Go Home" – 6:32 
"Rest in Peace" – 3:24

Personnel
Shankar – 10-string double violin, drum machine
Jan Garbarek – soprano and tenor saxophone
Zakir Hussain – tabla, congas
Trilok Gurtu – percussion

References

1985 albums
ECM Records albums
Lakshminarayana Shankar albums
Trilok Gurtu albums
Albums produced by Manfred Eicher